Daniel David Black (born July 2, 1987) is an American former professional baseball first baseman. He played in the Korea Baseball Organization for the KT Wiz in 2015 and in the Mexican League for the Diablos Rojos del México in 2016.

Career

Purdue
Black played college baseball at Purdue University from 2007 to 2009. During his career he hit 36 home runs. In 2008, he played collegiate summer baseball with the Cotuit Kettleers of the Cape Cod Baseball League. Black was drafted by the San Francisco Giants in the 35th round of the 2008 Major League Baseball (MLB) draft, but did not sign and returned to Purdue.

Chicago White Sox
Black was drafted by the Chicago White Sox in the 14th round of the 2009 MLB Draft. Black played in the White Sox minor league organization from 2009 to 2015.

KT Wiz
He was released by the White Sox on May 28, 2015 so that he could sign with the KT Wiz of the KBO League.

Miami Marlins
On December 24, 2015, Black signed a minor league contract with the Miami Marlins organization that included an invitation to Spring Training. He was released by the Marlins on May 26, 2016.

Diablos Rojos del Mexico
On June 7, 2016, Black signed with the Diablos Rojos del México of the Mexican Baseball League. He was released on September 23, 2016.

References

External links

Purdue Boilermakers bio
Career statistics and player information from Korea Baseball Organization

1987 births
Living people
Águilas Cibaeñas players
American expatriate baseball players in the Dominican Republic
American expatriate baseball players in Mexico
American expatriate baseball players in South Korea
Baseball players from Indianapolis
Birmingham Barons players
Bristol White Sox players
Charlotte Knights players
Cotuit Kettleers players
Diablos Rojos del México players
Kannapolis Intimidators players
KBO League first basemen
KT Wiz players
Mexican League baseball first basemen
New Orleans Zephyrs players
Purdue Boilermakers baseball players
Toros del Este players
United States national baseball team players
Winston-Salem Dash players
2015 WBSC Premier12 players